Neophytus VIII (1832 – 18 July 1909) was Ecumenical Patriarch of Constantinople from 1891 until his resignation in 1894.

References

See also
List of Ecumenical Patriarchs of Constantinople

1832 births
1909 deaths
Theological School of Halki alumni
Bishops of Adrianople
19th-century Ecumenical Patriarchs of Constantinople

People from Serres (regional unit)
Metropolitans of Preveza